Knox–Henderson Station was a proposed subway station along the Dallas Area Rapid Transit Light Rail in the Knox-Henderson neighborhood of Dallas, Texas. It would serve the Red, Blue, and Orange Lines located beneath the North Central Expressway (U.S. 75) at Willis Avenue.

DART's original system plan featured a tunnel underneath North Central Expressway, connecting Pearl Station and SMU/Mockingbird Station, with underground stations serving the Knox-Henderson and Cityplace neighborhoods. During construction of the tunnel in the 1990s, the station area for Knox–Henderson Station was excavated at an additional cost of $1 million and left as a shell for future development. Because of initial Vickery Place neighborhood objections, DART did not complete Knox–Henderson Station as part of its initial phase as planned. The station's shell, considered a ghost station, serves as an emergency exit from the tunnel. The nearby underground Cityplace Station, of similar design, was finished as planned and opened in December 2000.

By the mid-1990s, attitudes towards the station began to shift with the neighborhood actively petitioning DART to construct the station. However, funding problems related to the deferred construction doomed the station. By 2006, DART announced it would cost an estimated $100 million to complete and open Knox–Henderson Station. The large price tag was attributed to the high labor and infrastructure costs associated with working underground near actively used tracks.  In order to avoid interfering with existing rail service, tunneling and station construction work could only be carried out for four hours per day, between midnight and 4 a.m., when trains are not running. Due to the high costs involved, DART stated that it was deferring construction of the station indefinitely.

In January 2007, DART published the final version of its comprehensive 2030 Transit System Plan.  The plan contained no provisions for finishing or opening the station by 2030, and responded to public comments requesting completion of the station by declaring, "There are no plans for a station in the Knox-Henderson area."

On July 27, 2018, The Dallas Morning News published an article featuring photos and video views inside and details of the unfinished station.  

In January 2022, DART approved the 2045 Transit System Plan removing all mentions of the station entirely. 

As of 2022, DART does not list Knox–Henderson Station in its future expansion plans.

References

Dallas Area Rapid Transit light rail stations in Dallas
Abandoned rapid transit stations
Railway stations located underground in the United States